Christine von Grünigen (born 25 March 1964) is a Swiss former alpine skier who competed in the 1992 Winter Olympics and 1994 Winter Olympics. She is the sister of fellow former alpine skier Michael von Grünigen.

References

External links
 

1964 births
Living people
Swiss female alpine skiers
Olympic alpine skiers of Switzerland
Alpine skiers at the 1992 Winter Olympics
Alpine skiers at the 1994 Winter Olympics
Christine
20th-century Swiss women